Raywood may refer to:

Raywood, Aldgate, South Australia, heritage-listed home and gardens
Raywood, Victoria, Australia
Raywood, Texas, United States